Volleyball Bundesliga, is the highest level of men's volleyball in Germany, a professional league competition for volleyball clubs located in this country.

VfB Friedrichshafen is the most successful team with 13 championship victories.

Volleyball-Bundesliga teams – 2021/2022

Performance by club

See also 
 German Women's Volleyball League
 Sports in Germany

External links 
 Volleyball Bundesliga
 DVV official site

Volleyball in Germany
Germany
Sports leagues established in 1974
Sports leagues in Germany
Professional sports leagues in Germany